Jenkinsia is a genus of round herring in the family Clupeidae.  They are found in the central western Atlantic Ocean, the Gulf of Mexico, and the Caribbean Sea.  Four recognized species are placed in this genus.

Species 
 J. lamprotaenia (P. H. Gosse, 1851) (dwarf round herring)
 J.  majua Whitehead, 1963 (little-eye round herring)
 [[Jenkinsia parvula|J. parvula]] Cervigón & Velazquez, 1978 (short-striped round herring)
 J. stolifera'' (D. S. Jordan & C. H. Gilbert, 1884) (Florida round herring)

References 
 

 
Clupeidae
Marine fish genera
Taxa named by David Starr Jordan
Taxa named by Barton Warren Evermann
Taxonomy articles created by Polbot